This is a list of archives in Canada.

These archives, for the purposes of this list, are entities in Canada that work to acquire, preserve, and make available material as documentary evidence about a person, community, business, government, municipality, etc., for future generations. The types of archives categories—Business, Community, Cultural, Educational, Healthcare, Human Rights, Government, Military, Regional, Professional association, Religious, University/College, Sport, Arts—have been adapted from those used in the Archives Association of Ontario's Archeion. Archives that exist only in digital form are not included.

Archives in Canada

See also 

 List of archives
 List of Archives Associations specific to Canadian territories
 List of genealogical societies in Canada
 List of libraries in Canada
 List of museums in Canada 
 Culture of Canada
 Open access in Canada to scholarly communication

References 

 
Archives
Canada
Archives